Jackie Overfield (14 May 1932 – 29 December 2022) was an English professional footballer who played as a left winger.

Career
Born in Leeds, Overfield played for Yorkshire Amateur,  Leeds United, Sunderland, Peterborough United, and Bradford City.

Overfield died on 29 December 2022, at the age of 90.

References

1932 births
2022 deaths
English footballers
Association football wingers
English Football League players
Yorkshire Amateur A.F.C. players
Leeds United F.C. players
Sunderland A.F.C. players
Peterborough United F.C. players
Bradford City A.F.C. players
Footballers from Leeds